Skyliner is a wooden roller coaster located at Lakemont Park in Altoona, Pennsylvania. It first opened in 1960 at New York's Roseland Park, and was John C. Allen's first full-size coaster design. Roseland closed in 1985, and following the success Knoebels had in relocating wooden coaster Phoenix, Lakemont quickly followed suit, and the Skyliner reopened at its new home in 1987. The Skyliner operates a single train, with three cars, which have room for up to 18 adults. The ride's train uses Buzz bars. The Skyliner's train is painted with the Minor League baseball team Altoona Curve's team logo and colors. The phrase "GO CURVE" is also on the train. The Altoona Curve's baseball stadium is adjacent to Lakemont Park, with right field situated up against Skyliner. It is an ACE Coaster Classic.

Notes

References 

Roller coasters in Pennsylvania
Former roller coasters in New York (state)
1987 establishments in Pennsylvania